Each "article" in this category is a collection of entries about several stamp issuers, presented in alphabetical order. The entries are formulated on the micro model and so provide summary information about all known issuers.  

See the :Category:Compendium of postage stamp issuers page for details of the project.

Saar 

Dates 	1947 – 1959
Capital 	Saarbrücken
Currency 	(1947) 100 pfennige = 1 Saar mark
		(1947) 100 centimes = 1 Saar franc

Includes 	Saar (French Administration)

Saar (French Administration) 

Dates 	1920 – 1935
Capital 	Saarbrücken
Currency 	(1920) 100 pfennige = 1 mark
		(1921) 100 centimes = 1 franc

Refer 	Saar

Saar (French Zone) 

Stamps used were French Zone (General Issue) types which are cat. nos F1–F13 of Germany.  They were
replaced in 1947 by stamps specific to the Saar.

Dates 	1945 – 1947
Capital 	Saarbrücken
Currency 	100 pfennige = 1 mark

Refer 	Germany (Allied Occupation)

Saargebiet 

Refer 	Saar

Saarland 

Refer 	Saar

Sabah 

Dates 	1964 –
Capital 	Kota Kinabalu
Currency 	100 cents = 1 dollar

Main Article Needed 

See also 	Malaysia;
		North Borneo

Sachsen 

Refer 	Saxony

Sahara Espanol 

Refer 	Spanish Sahara

St Christopher 

Dates 	1870 – 1890
Capital 	Basseterre
Currency 	12 pence = 1 shilling; 20 shillings = 1 pound

Refer 	St Kitts

St Christopher Nevis & Anguilla 

Dates 	1952 – 1980
Capital 	Basseterre
Currency 	100 cents = 1 dollar

Main Article Needed 

Includes 	St Kitts-Nevis;
		St Kitts Nevis & Anguilla

See also 	Anguilla;
		Leeward Islands;
		Nevis;
		St Kitts

St Helena 

Dates 	1856 –
Capital 	Jamestown
Currency 	(1856) 12 pence = 1 shilling; 20 shillings = 1 pound
		(1971) 100 pence = 1 pound

Main Article Needed

St Kitts 

Dates 	1980 –
Capital 	Basseterre
Currency 	100 cents = 1 dollar

Main Article Needed 

Includes 	St Christopher

See also 	Leeward Islands;
		St Christopher Nevis & Anguilla

St Kitts-Nevis 

Dates 	1903 – 1980
Capital 	Basseterre
Currency 	(1903) 12 pence = 1 shilling; 20 shillings = 1 pound
		(1951) 100 cents = 1 dollar

Refer 	St Christopher Nevis & Anguilla

St Kitts Nevis & Anguilla 

Dates 	1967 – 1971
Capital 	Basseterre
Currency 	100 cents = 1 dollar

Refer 	St Christopher Nevis & Anguilla

St Lucia 

Dates 	1860 –
Capital 	Castries
Currency 	(1860) 12 pence = 1 shilling; 20 shillings = 1 pound
		(1949) 100 cents = 1 dollar

Main Article Postage stamps and postal history of St. Lucia

St Paul 

Refer 	French Southern & Antarctic Territories

St Pierre et Miquelon 

Dates 	1885 – 1978
Capital 	Saint-Pierre
Currency 	100 centimes = 1 franc

Main Article Needed

St Thomas & Prince Islands 

Refer 	Sao Tome e Principe

St Vincent 

Dates 	1861 –
Capital 	Kingstown
Currency 	(1861) 12 pence = 1 shilling; 20 shillings = 1 pound
		(1949) 100 cents = 1 dollar

Main Article Postage stamps and postal history of St. Vincent and the Grenadines

Ste Marie de Madagascar 

Dates 	1894 – 1896
Capital 	
Currency 	100 centimes = 1 franc

Refer 	Madagascar & Dependencies

Salonicco 

Refer 	Salonika (Italian Post Office)

Salonika (British Field Office) 

British stamps overprinted Levant.

Dates 	1916 only
Currency 	12 pence = 1 shilling; 20 shillings = 1 pound

Refer 	British Post Offices in the Turkish Empire

Salonika (Italian Post Office) 

Italian Post Office in Salonika when still under Turkish rule.  Issued Italian stamps overprinted SALONICCO.

Dates 	1909 – 1911
Currency 	40 paras = 1 piastre

Refer 	Italian Post Offices in the Turkish Empire

Salonika (Russian Post Office) 

Local overprint SALONIQUE.  The office normally used stamps of Russia or Russian Levant.

Dates 	1909 – 1914
Currency 	40 paras = 1 piastre

Refer 	Russian Post Offices in the Turkish Empire

Salonique 

Refer 	Salonika (Russian Post Office)

Samoa 

Dates 	1982 –
Capital 	Apia
Currency 	100 sene (cents) = 1 dollar

Main Article Postage stamps and postal history of Samoa

Includes 	Samoa (Kingdom);
		Samoa I Sisifo;
		Samoa (New Zealand Administration);
		Western Samoa

See also 	German Samoa

Samoa (Kingdom) 

Dates 	1877 – 1900
Capital 	Apia
Currency 	12 pence = 1 shilling; 20 shillings = 1 pound

Refer 	Samoa

Samoa I Sisifo 

Dates 	1958 – 1982
Capital 	Apia
Currency 	(1958) 12 pence = 1 shilling; 20 shillings = 1 pound
		(1967) 100 sene (cents) = 1 dollar

Refer 	Samoa

Samoa (New Zealand Administration) 

Dates 	1914 – 1935
Capital 	Apia
Currency 	12 pence = 1 shilling; 20 shillings = 1 pound

Refer 	Samoa

Samos 

Samos had been an independent principality, nominally under Turkish control, but with British, French and
Russian protection.  A revolt took place in September 1912 and the Turkish garrison withdrew.  A provisional
government was established under President Sophoulis, who sought political union with Greece.  This was
achieved by the Treaty of London on 30 May 1913.

Samos issued its own stamps from November 1912.  There were four issues and 19 stamps in all.  Greek stamps
were introduced in 1914, but there were also overprints of the Samos types until 1915.

Dates 	1912 – 1915
Capital 	Vathy
Currency 	100 lepta = 1 drachma

Main Article Needed 

See also 	Vathy (French Post Office)

San Marino 

Dates 	1877 –
Capital 	San Marino
Currency 	(1877) 100 centesimi = 1 lira
		(2002) 100 cent = 1 euro

Main Article Needed

Sandjak d'Alexandrette 

Refer 	Hatay

Santander 

Dates 	1884 – 1903
Currency 	100 centavos = 1 peso

Refer 	Colombian Territories

Sao Tome e Principe 

Dates 	1870 –
Capital 	Sao Tome
Currency 	(1870) 1000 reis = 1 milreis
		(1913) 100 centavos = 1 escudo
		(1977) 100 cents = 1 dobra

Main Article Needed 

See also 	Africa (Portuguese Colonies)

Sarajevo Government (Bosnia) 

Refer 	Bosnia & Herzegovina

Sarawak 

Dates 	1869 –
Capital 	Kuching
Currency 	100 cents = 1 dollar

Main Article Needed 

See also 	Malaysia

Sarawak (British Military Administration) 

Dates 	1945 only
Currency 	100 cents = 1 dollar

Refer 	BA/BMA Issues

Sarawak (Japanese Occupation) 

Dates 	1942 – 1945
Currency 100 cents = 1 dollar

Refer 	Japanese Occupation Issues

Sardinia 

Sardinia is a large island in the western Mediterranean, south of Corsica.  Before the unification of Italy,
the Kingdom of Sardinia was the name applied to a union of Sardinia and Piedmont, although the island was
very much the junior partner.  Stamps of this state were issued in Turin 1851–1862 but the country's name
is not shown.  Gibbons list these stamps under Sardinia, which is strictly correct, but historians generally
refer to the state as Piedmont.  To prevent confusion between the 19th century state and the present island
province, this work has Piedmont as the specific entry and Sardinia as a minor entry.

Capital 	Cagliari

Refer 	Italian States;
		Piedmont

Sarkari 

Refer 	Soruth (Saurashtra)

Sarre 

Refer 	Saar

Saseno (Italian Occupation) 

Dates 	1923 only
Currency 	100 centesimi = 1 lira

Refer 	Italian Occupation Issues

Saudi Arabia 

Dates 	1932 –
Capital 	Riyadh
Currency 	(1932) 110 guerche = 10 riyal = 1 gold sovereign
		(1952) 440 guerche = 40 riyal = 1 gold sovereign
		(1960) 100 halalas = 20 guerche = 1 riyal
		(1976) 100 halalas = 1 riyal

Main Article Needed 

Includes 	Hejaz;
		Hejaz-Nejd;
		Nejd

Saurashtra 

Refer 	Soruth (Saurashtra)

Saxony 

Dates 	1850 – 1868
Capital 	Dresden
Currency 	10 pfennige = 1 neugroschen; 30 neugroschen = 1 thaler

Refer 	German States

Saxony (Russian Zone) 

Dates 	1945 – 1946
Capital 	Halle
Currency 	100 pfennige = 1 mark

Refer 	Germany (Allied Occupation)

References

Bibliography
 Stanley Gibbons Ltd, Europe and Colonies 1970, Stanley Gibbons Ltd, 1969
 Stanley Gibbons Ltd, various catalogues
 Stuart Rossiter & John Flower, The Stamp Atlas, W H Smith, 1989
 XLCR Stamp Finder and Collector's Dictionary, Thomas Cliffe Ltd, c.1960

External links
 AskPhil – Glossary of Stamp Collecting Terms
 Encyclopaedia of Postal History

Sa